The 1937–38 Eintracht Frankfurt season was the 38th season in the club's football history. 

In 1937–38 the club played in the Gauliga Südwest/Mainhessen, the top tier of German football. It was the club's 5th season in the Gauliga Südwest/Mainhessen. 
The season ended up with Eintracht finishing as champions in the Gauliga Südwest/Mainhessen. In the German Championship round finished as runners-up.

Matches

Legend

Friendlies

Gauliga Südwest/Mainhessen

League fixtures and results

League table

Results summary

Results by round

German championship round (Group 1)

Tschammerpokal

Squad

Squad and statistics

|}

Transfers

In:

Out:

See also
 1938 German football championship

Notes

Sources

External links
 Official English Eintracht website 
 German archive site 

1937-38
German football clubs 1937–38 season